Walter Söderman (born 26 November 1904, date of death unknown) was a Swedish ice hockey player. Söderman was part of the Djurgården Swedish champions' team of 1926.

Söderman played bandy with Djurgårdens IF Bandy 1930–32.

References

External links 
 

1904 births
Djurgårdens IF Hockey players
Swedish ice hockey players
Year of death missing
Swedish bandy players
Djurgårdens IF Bandy players